The Mandalay Pitakataik (also Pitaka-taik) was the royal library in Mandalay, commissioned by King Mindon Min in 1857 during the founding of Mandalay as a royal capital. The library was one of seven structures built to mark the foundation and consecration of Mandalay as the royal capital. It was located at the foot of Mandalay Hill, and was a masonry building with teak joints. The building was modeled after the Pitakataik in Bagan. Copies of Tipiṭaka texts were relocated from the Amarapura Pitakataik and deposited at the newly constructed library in January 1864. The Pitakataik was formerly stocked with Pali and Burmese palm leaf manuscripts which were looted with the onset of British occupation in 1885.

In October 2013, the Sitagu Sayadaw announced a donation to rebuild the Pitakataik, along with the Thudhamma Zayat and Maha Pahtan Ordination Hall, with the consultation of Tampawaddy U Win Maung.

See also

Tipiṭaka
Pitakataik
Pitakataik (Bagan)
Tripiṭaka tablets at Kuthodaw Pagoda

References

Buildings and structures in Mandalay
Libraries in Myanmar
Buddhist libraries